Jacob Tirado (born ca. 1540; died in Jerusalem 1620) was one of the founders of the Spanish-Portuguese community of Amsterdam.

With several Marranos he sailed from Portugal in a vessel which was driven out of its course to Emden in East Friesland. Following the advice of Rabbi Moses Uri ha-Levi, he continued his travels with his companions to Amsterdam, c. 1593. After his arrival there, he confessed the Jewish faith openly, and afterwards, though advanced in years, underwent the rite of circumcision.

Together with Jacob Israel Belmonte and Samuel Pallache, Tirado founded the Spanish-Portuguese community of Amsterdam, being its first president.

Having acquired a house on the Houtgracht, he transformed it into Amsterdam's first synagogue, which was called after him Bet Ya'akob (Hebrew) or Casa de Jacob (Ladino), i.e., Beth Jacob, consecrated at the Jewish New Year's festival (September 1597).

Annually on Yom Kippur a special prayer in his behalf is recited as an acknowledgment of his important services to the community. In his old age Tirado traveled to Jerusalem, where he died.

See also
 Sephardic Jews
 Spanish-Portuguese community of Amsterdam
 History of the Jews in the Netherlands
 Samuel Pallache
 Pallache family

References

 The article entitled TIRADO, JACOB is now available at http://www.jewishencyclopedia.com/view.jsp?artid=221&letter=T .

Further reading
 Uri Phoebus Halevi: Narração da vinda dos judeos espanhoes a Amsterdam. Amsterdam, 1711. (new edition: Jacob S. da Silva Rosa, Amsterdam 1933)
 Odette Vlessing: New Light on the Earliest History of the Amsterdam Portuguese Jews. In: Jozeph Michman (ed.): Dutch Jewish History; 3. Jerusalem 1993, pp. 43–75. 
 Marc Saperstein: Exile in Amsterdam. Saul Levi Morteira's sermons to a congregation of "new Jews". Cincinnati 2005, pp. 149–154. 
 Robert Cohen: "Memoria Para Os Siglos Futuros": Myth and Memory on the Beginnings of the Amsterdam Sephardi Community. In: Jewish History, 2/1 (1987), pp. 67–72
 Miriam Bodian: Hebrews of the Portuguese nation. Conversos and community in early modern Amsterdam. Bloomington 1997.
 Ludwig Philippson: Jakob Tirado. Geschichtlicher Roman aus der zweiten Hälfte des sechszehnten Jahrhunderts. Leipzig 1867.

External links
The Marranos celebrate Yom Kippur in Amsterdam

16th-century converts to Judaism
17th-century converts to Judaism
Portuguese Jews
Dutch Sephardi Jews
1540 births
1620 deaths